Samajwadi Pension Scheme was a pension scheme for rural family to provide a monthly pension of 500Rs. or 6000Rs. per year. This scheme was launched by former chief minister shri Akhilesh Yadav.

History 
Samajwadi Pension Scheme was launched on 28 January 2014 by Akhilesh Yadav.

This scheme was frozen in 2017 because of beneficiaries identity verification.

In 2017 chief minister Yogi Adityanath ordered to remove Samajwadi word and replace with Mukhyamantri.

Scheme 
This scheme launched on the budget of 2424 crore Rupees.

See also 

 Hamari Beti Uska Kal Scheme

References 

Government schemes in Uttar Pradesh